Driftwood Creek is a stream in North Slope Borough, Alaska, in the United States. It is a tributary of the Utukok River.

Driftwood Creek was named for the driftwood collected there by surveyors for their campfires.

See also
List of rivers of Alaska

References

Rivers of North Slope Borough, Alaska
Rivers of Alaska